Events in the year 1827 in Norway.

Incumbents
Monarch: Charles III John

Events
 Count Baltzar von Platen is appointed Governor-general of Norway.

Arts and literature
 Christiania Offentlige Theater is founded by Johan Peter Strömberg.

Births
24 February – Haaken C. Mathiesen, landowner and businessperson (d.1913)
21 May – Axel Winge, politician (d.1893)
13 October – Johan Christian Tandberg Castberg, newspaper founder and editor and politician (d.1899)

Full date unknown
Knud Bergslien, painter and teacher (d.1908)
Nils Christian Egede Hertzberg, politician and Minister (d.1911)
Dan Weggeland, artist (d.1918)

Deaths
24 May – Anders Lysgaard (b.1756).

Full date unknown
Mathias Sommerhielm, politician (b.1764)

See also

References